Fairbourne Heath is a scattered settlement in the civil parish of Harrietsham, Kent, England. It is located on a crossroads of two minor roads. Fairbourne Manor Farm lies to the north.

Villages in Kent